Ducks Unlimited Canada (DUC) is a Canadian non-profit organization that works to conserve, restore and manage Canadian wetlands in order to preserve habitat for North American waterfowl, wildlife and people. They work with industry leaders, government agencies, landowners and other non-profit organizations to collaboratively protect critical habitats. DUC are a separate organization from Ducks Unlimited Inc. (DU) and Ducks Unlimited de Mexico (DUMAC). However, they collaborate on conservation projects.

History 
DUC was incorporated a year after DU Inc. in 1938 in Winnipeg, Manitoba. Their national headquarters are at Oak Hammock Marsh in Stonewall, Manitoba. Their first conservation project was in Big Grass Marsh outside Gladstone, Manitoba. It was privately funded by waterfowl hunters and conservationists, and was in partnership with the More Game Birds in America Foundation. Big Grass Marsh was drained for agricultural purposes from 1909 to 1916 in order to provide farmers with fertile fields to sow. However, the drainage of this wetland did not provide the irrigable land that the farmers had hoped for. The land became dusty and was too silty to farm. As such, restoration initiatives done by DUC and chief engineer Bill Campbell succeeded in revitalizing this habitat. Currently, Big Grass Marsh is a 5,000-ha habitat that is an integral molting and staging area for North American waterfowl such as Mallards, Snow Geese, and Canada Geese. 

Since Ducks Unlimited Canada’s incorporation they have expanded across Canada to open provincial offices in Ontario, British Columbia, Quebec, Saskatchewan, Alberta, as well as having offices in the Atlantic and in the Canadian territories.

Operations 
According to Ducks Unlimited Canada’s website they operate in six regions: The Pacific Coast, Pacific Interior, Great Lakes, Atlantic, Prairie Pothole Region and Canada’s boreal forest. They note that these regions account for nearly 70% of North America’s duck populations. 

They take a scientific approach to wetland conservation to inform their initiatives in wetland conservation, research, public policy and education.  As of 2019, DUC has completed more than 11,023 habitat conservation projects on over 56.2 million acres of Canadian land. DUC has long standing partnerships with the Canadian federal government to restore wetlands and grasslands in order to help mitigate the effects of climate change. In 2021 Environment and Climate Change Canada announced that DUC would receive $19 million in funding over three years to support prairie projects to help restore wetlands which are known to capture and store carbon.

References 

Environmental organizations based in Manitoba
Non-profit organizations based in Manitoba
Organizations established in 1938
1938 establishments in Manitoba
Stonewall, Manitoba